Debasish Kumar   is an Indian politician member of All India Trinamool Congress. He is an MLA, elected from the Rashbehari constituency in the 2021 West Bengal Legislative Assembly election.
He was the ex-Mayor in Council of Kolkata Municipal Corporation and the present Member Board of Administrators of Kolkata Municipal Corporation.
Debasish Kumar is also the District President, South Kolkata District of All India Trinamool Congress.

References 

Trinamool Congress politicians from West Bengal
Living people
People from Kolkata district
West Bengal MLAs 2021–2026
1959 births